Discina is a genus of ascomycete fungi related to the false morels of the genus Gyromitra. There are about 20 species in the genus. They bear dish- or cup-shaped fruit bodies. The best known member is the pig ear (D. perlata), which is deemed edible after thorough cooking, although is viewed with suspicion given its relation to the highly toxic false morels.

Species
Discina accumbens
Discina ancilis
Discina australica
Discina brunnea
Discina caroliniana
Discina corticalis
Discina disticha
Discina epixyla
Discina fastigiata
Discina ferruginascens
Discina geogenius
Discina lenta
Discina martinii
Discina megalospora
Discina melaleuca
Discina montana
Discina pallida
Discina pallidorosea
Discina radiosensilis
Discina roblinensis
Discina urnula

References

Discinaceae
Pezizales genera